Joseph Lewi (August 17, 1820, Radnitz (now Radnice) – December 19, 1897, Albany) was an American physician of Czech Jewish extraction.  

He was one of the first Jewish professionals in Albany and the first Jewish physician in Albany.

Biography
Lewi was born in Radnice and educated at the universities of Prague and Vienna. After graduating from the latter university (MD 1846), he was appointed assistant at the Vienna Lying-in Hospital.  In 1847, he began to practise in Radnitz. Lewi's first patient was the daughter of Isaac Mayer Wise, who was to become the first rabbi in Albany and the most notable American Jewish leader of the 19th century.

In 1948,  at Wise's suggestion, he emigrated to America, settling in Albany, where his family shared a house with the Wise family.  There he was appointed on the staff of the Albany hospital, and became a member and later president of the Albany County Medical Society, and senior censor of the State Medical Society. Lewi was one of the forty-two citizens of Albany who organized, in 1863, the Union League in that city.

Thirteen of Lewi's fourteen children survived him. The oldest son was the journalist Isidor Lewi (1850–1938). He was educated at The Albany Academy, became connected with several newspapers, and was an editorial writer for the New York Tribune and publisher of the "New Era Illustrated Magazine." Another son, Maurice J. Lewi (born Albany December 1, 1857), was a physician in New York City. He graduated from the Albany Medical College in 1877. After a postgraduate course in Heidelberg and Vienna he began to practice in Albany in 1880, became a lecturer at the Albany Medical College and professor of medical jurisprudence at the Albany Law School, and later became secretary of the state board of medical examiners.

Lewi died on December 19, 1897 in Albany, New York.

References

 

Austro-Hungarian emigrants to the United States
New-York Tribune personnel
19th-century American physicians
Albany Medical College alumni
American people of Czech-Jewish descent
1820 births
1897 deaths
People from Rokycany District
The Albany Academy alumni